Abdelaziz "Abdel" Bouhazama (born 4 January 1969) is a French professional football manager and former player who was most recently the head coach of  club Angers. As a player, he was a midfielder.

Managerial career 
On 24 November 2022, Angers manager Gérald Baticle was suspended by the club, and replaced by Bouhazama on an interim basis. The former was eventually sacked on 22 December, with Bouhazama taking charge of the team following the conclusion of the break for the 2022 FIFA World Cup. He made his Ligue 1 managerial debut on 28 December, an eventual 1–0 defeat away to Ajaccio. On 5 January 2023, one day after his 54th birthday, Bouhazama was confirmed as head coach of Angers on a permanent basis following his interim spell.

He resigned on 7 March 2023 after making inappropriate remarks during the chat preceding a 5–0 defeat against Montpellier two days earlier.

Managerial statistics

Controversy 
During his time as the head of Angers's youth academy, Bouhazama was accused of mistreating young players of the club. He has been accused of humiliating, insulting, intimidating, and threatening players, and his management style has been described as "management by terror". Several former players of Angers's academy, such as Pierre Freuchet and Joseph Séry, have explicitly testified against Bouhazama.

Personal life 
Born in France, Bouhazama is of Moroccan descent.

Honours

Manager 
Saint-Étienne U19

 Coupe Gambardella runner-up: 2010–11, 2011–12

Angers B

 Championnat National 3: 2018–19

References 

1969 births
Living people
French footballers
Moroccan footballers
French sportspeople of Moroccan descent
Association football midfielders
CD Abarán players
Grenoble Foot 38 players
Tours FC players
SO Châtellerault players
French Division 3 (1971–1993) players
Ligue 2 players
Championnat National 2 players
French expatriate footballers
Moroccan expatriate footballers
Expatriate footballers in Spain
French expatriate sportspeople in Spain
Moroccan expatriate sportspeople in Spain
French football managers
Moroccan football managers
Tours FC non-playing staff
AS Saint-Étienne non-playing staff
Angers SCO non-playing staff
Angers SCO managers
Championnat National 3 managers
Championnat National 2 managers
Ligue 1 managers